Viktor Gustaf Crondahl (April 5, 1887 – January 8, 1953) was a Swedish diver who competed in the 1912 Summer Olympics.

He was born in Karlskrona and died in Seattle, United States.

1912 Summer Olympics
Viktor finished fourth in the plain high diving competition during the 1912 summer Olympics in Stockholm, Sweden.

References

External links
profile

1887 births
1953 deaths
Swedish male divers
Olympic divers of Sweden
Divers at the 1912 Summer Olympics
People from Karlskrona
Sportspeople from Blekinge County
20th-century Swedish people
Swedish emigrants to the United States